The 2034 FIFA World Cup will be the 25th FIFA World Cup, a quadrennial international men's football championship  contested by the national teams of the member associations of FIFA.

Host selection 

The bidding process for the 2034 World Cup has yet to start. However, some early bids have been proposed, with a host likely to be selected in 2027. The following is a list of expressed bidding interest:

Association of Southeast Asian Nations (ASEAN) 

The first bid for the 2034 FIFA World Cup has been proposed as a collective bid by the members of the Association of Southeast Asian Nations. The idea of a combined ASEAN bid had been mooted as early as January 2011, when the former Football Association of Singapore President, Zainudin Nordin, said in a statement that the proposal had been made at an ASEAN Foreign Ministers meeting, despite the fact that countries cannot bid (as that's up to national associations). In 2013, Nordin and Special Olympics Malaysia President, Datuk Mohamed Feisol Hassan, recalled the idea for ASEAN to jointly host a World Cup. Under FIFA rules as of 2017, the 2030 World Cup cannot be held in Asia (AFC) as Asian Football Confederation members are excluded from the bidding following the selection of Qatar in 2022. Therefore, the earliest bid by an AFC member could be made for 2034.

Later, Malaysia withdrew from involvement, but Singapore and other ASEAN countries continued the campaign to submit a joint bid for the World Cup in 2034. In February 2017, ASEAN held talks on launching a joint bid during a visit by FIFA President Gianni Infantino to Yangon, Myanmar. On 1 July 2017, Vice General Chairman of the Football Association of Indonesia Joko Driyono said that Indonesia and Thailand were set to lead a consortium of Southeast Asian nations in the bid. Driyono added that due to geographic and infrastructure considerations and the expanded format (48 teams), at least two or three ASEAN countries combined would be in a position necessary to host matches.

In September 2017, the Thai League 1 Deputy CEO Benjamin Tan, at the ASEAN Football Federation (AFF) Council meeting, confirmed that his Association has "put in their interest to bid and co-host" the 2034 World Cup with Indonesia. On the same occasion, the General Secretary of the AFF, Dato Sri Azzuddin Ahmad, confirmed that Indonesia and Thailand will submit a joint bid. Indonesia was the first Asian team and the only Southeast Asian country to have participated in the World Cup, when the territory was known as the Dutch East Indies.

However, in June 2018, FIFA executive committee member, Yang di-Pertuan Agong and Sultan of Pahang, Tengku Abdullah who is also the former president of the Football Association of Malaysia (FAM) expressed interest in joining the two countries in hosting the World Cup together. The same year, Vietnam expressed interest in joining the bid for the same competition, despite some infrastructure concerns due to the poorer status of Vietnamese economy. The four countries have jointly hosted a football event before during the 2007 AFC Asian Cup.

In June 2019, the Prime Minister of Thailand, Prayuth Chan-o-cha announced that all 10 nations of ASEAN will launch a joint-bid to host the 2034 FIFA World Cup, being the first to submit a ten-country joint bid in the FIFA World Cup history.

On 9 October 2019, five ASEAN countries officially proposed hosting the 2034 FIFA World Cup. Thailand is to lead the initiative.

On 15 June 2022, Cambodian Prime Minister Hun Sen, in his role as chair of ASEAN, said he would urge Southeast Asian leaders to bid to host the FIFA World Cup in 2034 or 2038.

Australia 

After its failed bid to host the 2022 FIFA World Cup, Australia has considered a joint bid with neighbouring New Zealand, an OFC member with which they will co-host the 2023 FIFA Women's World Cup.  Australia re-established this intention in August 2021, shortly after Brisbane's success in bidding to host the 2032 Summer Olympics. A joint bid with Indonesia and other ASEAN nations instead of New Zealand was also discussed by Football Australia. However, Indonesia has remained reluctant to the joint bid with Australia, considering the country is also taking part in the ASEAN bid for the same competition.

Expressed interest in bidding below: 

 AFC:
 
 ,  and 
 AFC–OFC:
,  and/or 
 CAF:

References 

2034
2034 in association football
Scheduled association football competitions
2034